Kilpatrick railway station serves the village of Old Kilpatrick in the West Dunbartonshire region of Scotland. The station is managed by ScotRail and is on the North Clyde Line, 11 miles (18 km) west of Glasgow and the Argyle Line on Sundays.

Part of the station sits under the northern end of the Erskine Bridge with Lusset Park overlooking the station from above. Access to Station Road is from the south side on the westbound platform. The Lusset Glen is also accessible from the westbound platform.

Facilities 
The station is a split, two-platform station with ramp access and a small ticket office. There is no auto-announcement system at present. In September 1989, an armed robbery took place and the two men held up the member of staff with double barreled shotguns. After this crime, the station has been unmanned until the present day. A woman was also killed in an apparent suicide attempt; she was struck by a train in October 2011 at the station.

Services

2006/07

2016
Sunday services run half-hourly to Balloch and to Glasgow Central Low Level (and thence alternately to Motherwell via  and to ).

References

Sources

External links

Video footage of Kilpatrick Station

Railway stations in West Dunbartonshire
Former North British Railway stations
Railway stations in Great Britain opened in 1858
SPT railway stations
Railway stations served by ScotRail